Noor Rahman (Arabic:نور رحمان; born 28 March 1997) is a Qatari born-Pakistani footballer. He currently plays as a right back for Al-Markhiya.

Career

Lekhwiya
Noor Rahman started his career at Lekhwiya and is a product of the Lekhwiya's youth system. On 15 April 2017, Noor Rahman made his professional debut for Lekhwiya against Al-Shahania in the Pro League, replacing Khaled Radhwan .

Al-Duhail
He was playing with Lekhwiya and after merging El Jaish and Lekhwiya clubs under the name Al-Duhail he was joined to Al-Duhail.

Al-Wakrah
On 1 February 2019 left Al-Duhail and signed with Al-Wakrah on loan until the end of the season.

External links

References

Living people
1997 births
Qatari footballers
Qatari people of Pakistani descent
Naturalised citizens of Qatar
Lekhwiya SC players
Al-Duhail SC players
Al-Wakrah SC players
Al-Shahania SC players
Al-Markhiya SC players
Qatar Stars League players
Qatari Second Division players
Association football fullbacks
Place of birth missing (living people)